The year 2011 is the 19th year in the history of the Ultimate Fighting Championship (UFC), a mixed martial arts promotion based in the United States. In 2011 the UFC held 27 events beginning with, UFC 125: Resolution.

Title fights

The Ultimate Fighter

Debut UFC fighters

The following fighters fought their first UFC fight in 2011:

Aaron Rosa
Alex Caceres
Alex Soto
Alistair Overeem
Anthony Njokuani
Anthony Pettis
Antonio Banuelos
Antonio McKee
Bart Palaszewski
Benson Henderson
Brad Pickett
Brian Bowles
Brian Ebersole
Bryan Caraway
Byron Bloodworth
Chad Mendes
Chan Sung Jung
Charlie Valencia
Che Mills
Chris Cariaso
Chris Cope
Chris Weidman
Clay Harvison
Clifford Starks
Cole Escovedo
Costas Philippou
Cub Swanson
Cung Le
Curt Warburton
Damacio Page
Danny Castillo
Danny Downes
Darren Uyenoyama
Dave Herman
Demetrious Johnson
Dennis Bermudez
Diego Brandao
Diego Nunes
Dominick Cruz
Donald Cerrone
Donny Walker
Dustin Jacoby

Dustin Neace
Dustin Pague
Dustin Poirier
Eddie Wineland
Edward Faaloloto
Edwin Figueroa
Erick Silva
Erik Koch
Felipe Arantes
Francis Carmont
Francisco Rivera
Hatsu Hioki
Jake Hecht
James Head
Jason Young
Javier Vazquez
Jeff Hougland
Jimy Hettes
John Albert
John Cholish
John Dodson
John Maguire
John Olav Einemo
Johnny Bedford
Johnny Eduardo
Jorge Lopez
José Aldo
Joseph Benavidez
Joseph Sandoval
Josh Clopton
Josh Ferguson
Josh Grispi
Justin Edwards
Kamal Shalorus
Ken Stone
Kenny Robertson
Lance Benoist
Louis Gaudinot
Luis Ramos
Maciej Jewtuszko
Mackens Semerzier

Marcus Brimage
Matt Lucas
Michael McDonald
Miguel Torres
Mike Easton
Mike Stumpf
Mitch Clarke
Nick Ring
Norifumi Yamamoto
Papy Abedi
Paul Bradley
Phil De Fries
Ramsey Nijem
Rani Yahya
Raphael Assunção
Renan Barão
Reuben Duran
Ricardo Lamas
Riki Fukuda
Robbie Peralta
Roland Delorme
Ronny Markes
Ryan McGillivray
Scott Jorgensen
Shamar Bailey
Shane Roller
Stanislav Nedkov
Stephen Bass
Steven Siler
Stipe Miocic
T.J. Dillashaw
Takeya Mizugaki
Tom Blackledge
Tony Ferguson
Urijah Faber
Vagner Rocha
Vaughan Lee
Walel Watson
Willamy Freire
Yuri Alcantara
Yves Jabouin
Zhang Tiequan

Events list

See also
 UFC
 List of UFC champions
 List of UFC events

References

Ultimate Fighting Championship by year
2011 in mixed martial arts